Sylvanus Wood (1604 – November 1675) was an English politician who sat in the House of Commons in 1654.

Wood was the son of Richard Wood of Brookthorpe and his wife Anne Vaughan, daughter of Walter Vaughan of Hergest, Herefordshire. He became a student of Lincoln's Inn  and was called to the bar on 7 December 1632. In 1642, he was appointed a commissioner for the city of Gloucester. 
  
In 1654, Wood was elected Member of Parliament for Gloucestershire in the First Protectorate Parliament. 
 
Wood died at the age of 71.

Wood married Bridget Cresheld, daughter of Richard Cresheld of Evesham.

References

1604 births
1675 deaths
English MPs 1654–1655
Politicians from Gloucestershire